The 2013 Balkan Athletics Championships was the 66th edition of the annual track and field competition for athletes from the Balkans, organised by Balkan Athletics. It was held at Beroe Stadium in Stara Zagora, Bulgaria on 27 and 28 July. Romania topped the medal table with eleven gold medals among a total haul of 26. The host nation Bulgaria had the second highest number of gold medals, with nine in a total of 21, while Turkey had the second highest medal total with 23. Turkey won the men's side of the competition while Romania won the women's side.

Amela Terzić of Serbia was the only athlete to win multiple individual events, taking the women's 1500 metres and 3000 metres titles. Bulgaria's Ivet Lalova  and Romania's Adelina Pastor took gold for their countries in both individual and relay events over 100 metres and 400 metres, respectively. The other multiple individual medallists were Turkey's Elif Karabulut (twice runner-up behind Terzić), sprint and hurdles medalist Vania Stambolova.

Results

Men

Women

Medal table

References
 BalkanC Stara Zagora BUL 27 – 28 July 2013. tilastopaja.org . Retrieved 2020-10-22.
 2013 Balkan Senior Championships. Balkan Athletics. Retrieved 2020-10-22.

2013
Sport in Stara Zagora
International athletics competitions hosted by Bulgaria
Balkan Athletics Championships
Balkan Athletics Championships
Balkan Athletics Championships